The Gryphon is a military wingpack that currently allows paratroopers to exit an aircraft at an altitude of 10 kilometres, then fly 40 kilometres while carrying up to 100 pounds of equipment. The system is still in development and the goal, according to Elektroniksystem- und Logistik-GmbH (Electronic System and Logistics Group or ESG), is to allow paratroopers to fly up to 200 kilometres per hour, thus enabling them to penetrate enemy airspace without compromising the safety of the aircraft or being detected by radar.

References

External links
 Attack Wing: Glider Makes Waves With Stealth and Speed - FOXNews.com. April 24, 2008.
  Flugobjekt "Gryphon": Militäreinsatz statt Funsport - Video by der Spiegel
 James Bond-style strap-on jet pack flying wing to extend special forces' reach. June 1, 2006.

Parachuting